Krasnokamianka may refer to:
 Krasnokamianka (urban-type settlement)
 Krasnokamianka (village)

See also
 Krasnokamenka (disambiguation)